Let Go for Love (Chinese: 放手愛) is a 2014 Chinese romantic comedy film directed by Aman Chang.

Cast
Chapman To
Charlene Choi

Reception
The film has grossed ¥1.66 million (US$266,000) in China.

References

2014 romantic comedy films
Chinese romantic comedy films
2014 films
Films directed by Aman Chang